From The Bench Digital Entertainment (Also From The Bench Games), commonly referred to as From The Bench or simply FTB is a technological firm and a social networking video game developer based in Spain. It works on the development and promotion of social interactive games of sport nature. Until now, From The Bench has released several games on iPhone, Facebook and also Android platforms.

It has developed & launched several successful titles such as Real Madrid Fantasy Manager, AC Milan Fantasy Manager, Liverpool FC Fantasy Manager & MotoGP Fantasy Manager. The current launches include Be a Legend: Football, Evolution Manager & NBA General Manager.

In May 2022, it was announced From The Bench had been acquired by the Barcelona-based digital advertising company, Tappx

References

External links
 Official Website
 From The Bench on Facebook
 From The Bench on Twitter

Video game development companies
Video game companies of Spain